Chartrettes is a commune in the Seine-et-Marne department in the Île-de-France region in north-central France.

Weather
During winter the expected temperature for Chartrettes is 0–7 °C (33–43 °F.) During spring and autumn it is 5–11 °C (38–58 °F.) During summer it has a huge bracket from 7–30 °C (44.6–86 °F.) It is highly unlikely to snow. It is very humid and sunny. It hardly ever rains and winds reach 32 kmh (20 mph).

Demographics
The inhabitants are called Chartrettois.

See also
Communes of the Seine-et-Marne department

References

External links

1999 Land Use, from IAURIF (Institute for Urban Planning and Development of the Paris-Île-de-France région) 
 

Communes of Seine-et-Marne